Chak Suhele Wala is a village in Punjab, India.

Villages in Firozpur district